Petra Bekaert (born 28 September 1967) is a swimmer who represented the Netherlands Antilles. She competed in the women's 100 metre backstroke at the 1984 Summer Olympics.

References

External links
 

1967 births
Living people
Dutch Antillean female swimmers
Olympic swimmers of the Netherlands Antilles
Swimmers at the 1984 Summer Olympics
Place of birth missing (living people)
Female backstroke swimmers